Tobel-Affeltrangen railway station is a railway station in the municipality of Tobel-Tägerschen, in the Swiss canton of Thurgau. It is an intermediate stop on the standard gauge Wil–Kreuzlingen line of THURBO.

Services 
The following services stop at Tobel-Affeltrangen:

 St. Gallen S-Bahn : half-hourly service from Wil to Romanshorn.

References

External links 
 
 

Railway stations in the canton of Thurgau
THURBO stations